Henrietta Island is the northernmost island of the De Long archipelago in the East Siberian Sea. Administratively it belongs to Yakutia of the Russian Federation.

Geography
Cape Melville (Mys Mel'villya), Henrietta's northernmost landhead, is the northernmost point of the De Long Islands, as well as the northernmost land thousands of miles east and west. The closest land is Jeannette Island, located to the east-southeast.

Ice cap

Geology
Henrietta Island consists of unmetamorphosed, folded and faulted Ediacaran and Middle-Upper Cambrian volcaniclastic sedimentary strata and Upper Cambrian basalt.

They are similar to the volcaniclastic rocks observed on Jeanette Island. These turbidites are mainly fine-grained, grading from siltstones at their base to mudstones at their top. Rare beds of pebbly breccias with a sandy matrix occur at the base of the coarser turbidites. Their pebbles are composed of volcanic rocks. These strata contain several meters of red tuffs and synsedimentary slump structures.

The Cambrian strata consists of two sets of sedimentary strata. In the northern clifts of Henrietta Island, a bed of basaltic andesite occurs within this set of strata. It conformably overlies the Ediacaran strata. The sandstone contains beds of quartz conglomerates and subordinate beds of siltstones. Sandstones exhibit parallel and planar-lamination with occasional ripple marks. Thick beds of Upper Cambrian basalt and andesitic basalt unconformably overlie these beds.

The intensity of tectonic deformation varies across the island. The most intense deformation, folding and thrusting, occurs in the southwest part of Henrietta Island. In contrast, the strata are monoclinal with gently dipping beds in the south, east, and north of the island. The Ediacaran and Cambrian strata have been intruded by numerous sills and dikes of basalt and porphyritic diorite.

History
However, the ship entered an ice pack near Herald Island in September 1879 and became trapped. The vessel drifted several hundred miles with the ice, passing north of Wrangel Island. In May 1881 it approached Jeannette Island and Henrietta Island. According to The Annual Report of the Secretary of the Navy, for the Year 1882 (p. 16), "A sled party landed, hoisted the national ensign, and took possession in the name of the United States". The excursion was led by George W. Melville, accompanied by William Dunbar, William Nindemann, Hans Erichsen, Walter Sharvell and James Bartlett. They landed on June 2 or 3, constructed a cairn, and placed inside it a record of their visit.

During the 1914–1915 Imperial Russian Arctic Ocean Hydrographic Expedition led by Boris Vilkitsky, the Vaygach approached Jeannette Island with the intention of mapping Jeannette and Henrietta Islands, but heavy ice blocked the approach. In 1916 the Russian ambassador in London issued an official notice to the effect that the Imperial government considered Henrietta, along with other Arctic islands, integral parts of the Russian Empire. This territorial claim was later maintained by the Soviet Union.

A Soviet polar station was established on Henrietta Island in 1937 in an expedition by Rudolf Samoylovich, and closed in 1963. Henrietta Island served in 1979 as the starting point for a Soviet expedition to the North Pole on skis.

Some U.S. individuals assert American ownership of Henrietta Island, and others of the De Long group, based on the 1881 discovery and claim. However, according to the U.S. Department of State in 2003, the U.S. government has never claimed Henrietta Island.

Physical description

Henrietta Island was described by the sled party from the De Long expedition in the following terms: "The island is a desolate rock, surmounted by a snow-cap, which feeds several discharging glaciers on its east face.  Dovekies nesting in the face of the rock are the only signs of game.  A little moss, some grass, and a handful of rock were brought back as trophies.  The cliffs are inaccessible, because of their steepness."

References

External links
Anisimov, M.A., and V.E. Tumskoy, 2002, Environmental History of the Novosibirskie Islands for the last 12 ka. 32nd International Arctic Workshop, Program and Abstracts 2002. Institute of Arctic and Alpine Research, University of Colorado at Boulder, pp 23–25.
Anonymous, 1923, Wrangel Island. The Geographical Journal, Vol. 62, No. 6. pp. 440–444 (Dec., 1923). (requires JSTOR access).
Headland, R.K., 1994, OSTROVA DE-LONGA ('De Long Islands'). Scott Polar Research Institute, Cambridge University. Lasted visited May 26, 2008.
Schirrmeister, L., H.-W. Hubberten, V. Rachold, and V.G. Grosse, 2005, Lost world - Late Quaternary environment of periglacial Arctic shelves and coastal lowlands in NE-Siberia.  2nd International Alfred Wegener Symposium Bremerhaven, October, 30 - November 2, 2005.

De Long Islands
Islands of the East Siberian Sea
Islands of the Sakha Republic